Netherlands competed at the 2017 World Games in Wroclaw, Poland, from July 20, 2017 to July, 30 2017.

Competitors

Gymnastic

Trampoline
Netherlands has qualified at the 2017 World Games:

Women's Synchronized Trampoline - 1 quota

Karate
Netherlands has qualified at the 2017 World Games:

Men's Individual Kumite -60kg - 1 quota (Geoffrey Berens)

Korfball
Netherlands has qualified at the 2017 World Games in the Korfball Mixed Team event.

Preliminary round

Semifinal

Final

Tug of war 

Netherlands won the silver medal in the men's outdoor 700 kg event.

References 

Nations at the 2017 World Games
2017 in Dutch sport
2017